The Australia women's national rugby league team, also known as the Australian Jillaroos, or Harvey Norman Jillaroos for sponsorship reasons, represents Australia in women's rugby league. They are administered by the Australian Rugby League Commission and Australian Women's Rugby League.

The Australian Jillaroos are current world champions, having won the last two Women's Rugby League World Cup tournaments, in 2013 and 2017. Appointed in 2016, the current head coach of the Jillaroos is Brad Donald.

Matches have been broadcast on free-to-air networks since 2014 (Nines) and 2015 (Test Match).

The Jillaroos squad is selected by a panel of national selectors. There are specific tournaments and matches that act as selection trials. These include:
 The Women's State of Origin between Queensland and New South Wales teams.
 The NRL Women's Premiership
 All Stars match
 The National Championships
 Affiliated States Championships (VIC, SA, WA, NT)

Current roster

Players' ages are as at the date that the table was last updated, which was 20 November 2022 (after the Final of the 2021 Women's Rugby League World Cup).

Notes:
 Original selections Millie Boyle (work commitments) and Tamika Upton (calf injury) withdrew on 4 October and were replaced by Shaylee Bent and Emma Tonegato.

Coaches
The current coach of the Australian team is Brad Donald. Previous coaches have included Paul Dyer, Graham Murray, and Steve Folkes.

Table last updated 20 November 2022.

Results

Full internationals

Other international matches

Nines

Head to Head Records
Table last updated 20 November 2022. Share is the portion of "For" points compared to the sum of "For" and "Against" points.

Individual Awards
Since 2015 a Female Player of the Year award has been included in the Dally M Awards.

Individual Records
This section last updated 20 November 2022

Games played: 32
 Tahnee Norris

Points scored: 70
 Ali Brigginshaw

Tries scored: 14
 Sam Bremner
 Isabelle Kelly

Goals kicked: 30 
 Lauren Brown

Points scored in a match: 20
 Sam Bremner (5 tries) vs , World Cup, 8 July 2013
 Maddie Studdon (1 try, 8 goals) vs , World Cup, 22 November 2017
 Lauren Brown (10 goals) vs , World Cup, 6 November 2022

Tries scored in a match: 5
 Sam Bremner vs , World Cup, 8 July 2013

Goals kicked in a match: 10
 Lauren Brown vs , World Cup, 6 November 2022

See also

Men
  Australian Kangaroos 
  Australian Aboriginal rugby league team
  Junior Kangaroos
  Australian Schoolboys
  Prime Minister's XIII
Women's Governance and History
  Women's rugby league in Australia
Women's Teams
  Indigenous All Stars
  Queensland women's rugby league team
  New South Wales women's rugby league team
  City New South Wales women's rugby league team
  Country New South Wales women's rugby league team 
Women's Competitions
 Tier 1  NRL Women's Premiership
 Tier 2  QRL Women's Premiership
 Tier 2  NSWRL Women's Premiership
 Tier 3  Sydney Metropolitan Women's Rugby League
 Tier 3  Brisbane and District Women's Rugby League

References

External links